The 2009–10 NBL season was the 32nd season of competition since its establishment in 1979. A total of eight teams contested the league. The 48-minute game switched to a 40-minute game.

Preseason 
Pre-season training began for a majority of clubs during the last week of July.

A pre-season tourney, dubbed the NBL Top End Challenge, involving all eight sides was contested during August in Darwin, Northern Territory.

Wollongong Hawks exhibition games

Burger King Breakers Pre-season Tour

Melbourne Tigers exhibition games

Gold Coast Blaze exhibition games

2009 Crocs Pre-season Assault

2009 Coca-Cola Pre-season Championship

Cairns Taipans exhibition games

NBL Top End Challenge

Wollongong Hawks win Top End Challenge.

Hood Sweeney Pre-season Challenge

Regular season

The 2009–10 regular season took place over 20 rounds between 24 September 2009 and 14 February 2010.

Round 1

|- bgcolor="#CCCCFF" font size=1
!width=90| Date
!width=180| Home
!width=60| Score
!width=180| Away
!width=260| Venue
!width=70| Crowd
!width=70| Boxscore

Round 2

|- bgcolor="#CCCCFF" font size=1
!width=90| Date
!width=180| Home
!width=60| Score
!width=180| Away
!width=260| Venue
!width=70| Crowd
!width=70| Boxscore

Round 3

|- bgcolor="#CCCCFF" font size=1
!width=90| Date
!width=180| Home
!width=60| Score
!width=180| Away
!width=260| Venue
!width=70| Crowd
!width=70| Boxscore

Round 4

|- bgcolor="#CCCCFF" font size=1
!width=90| Date
!width=180| Home
!width=60| Score
!width=180| Away
!width=260| Venue
!width=70| Crowd
!width=70| Boxscore

Round 5

|- bgcolor="#CCCCFF" font size=1
!width=90| Date
!width=180| Home
!width=60| Score
!width=180| Away
!width=260| Venue
!width=70| Crowd
!width=70| Boxscore

Round 6

|- bgcolor="#CCCCFF" font size=1
!width=90| Date
!width=180| Home
!width=60| Score
!width=180| Away
!width=260| Venue
!width=70| Crowd
!width=70| Boxscore

Round 7

|- bgcolor="#CCCCFF" font size=1
!width=90| Date
!width=180| Home
!width=60| Score
!width=180| Away
!width=260| Venue
!width=70| Crowd
!width=70| Boxscore

Round 8

|- bgcolor="#CCCCFF" font size=1
!width=90| Date
!width=180| Home
!width=60| Score
!width=180| Away
!width=260| Venue
!width=70| Crowd
!width=70| Boxscore

Round 9

|- bgcolor="#CCCCFF" font size=1
!width=90| Date
!width=180| Home
!width=60| Score
!width=180| Away
!width=260| Venue
!width=70| Crowd
!width=70| Boxscore

Round 10

|- bgcolor="#CCCCFF" font size=1
!width=90| Date
!width=180| Home
!width=60| Score
!width=180| Away
!width=260| Venue
!width=70| Crowd
!width=70| Boxscore

Round 11

|- bgcolor="#CCCCFF" font size=1
!width=90| Date
!width=180| Home
!width=60| Score
!width=180| Away
!width=260| Venue
!width=70| Crowd
!width=70| Boxscore

Round 12

|- bgcolor="#CCCCFF" font size=1
!width=90| Date
!width=180| Home
!width=60| Score
!width=180| Away
!width=260| Venue
!width=70| Crowd
!width=70| Boxscore

Round 13

|- bgcolor="#CCCCFF" font size=1
!width=90| Date
!width=180| Home
!width=60| Score
!width=180| Away
!width=260| Venue
!width=70| Crowd
!width=70| Boxscore

Round 14

|- bgcolor="#CCCCFF" font size=1
!width=90| Date
!width=180| Home
!width=60| Score
!width=180| Away
!width=260| Venue
!width=70| Crowd
!width=70| Boxscore

Round 15

|- bgcolor="#CCCCFF" font size=1
!width=90| Date
!width=180| Home
!width=60| Score
!width=180| Away
!width=260| Venue
!width=70| Crowd
!width=70| Boxscore

Round 16

|- bgcolor="#CCCCFF" font size=1
!width=90| Date
!width=180| Home
!width=60| Score
!width=180| Away
!width=260| Venue
!width=70| Crowd
!width=70| Boxscore

Round 17

|- bgcolor="#CCCCFF" font size=1
!width=90| Date
!width=180| Home
!width=60| Score
!width=180| Away
!width=260| Venue
!width=70| Crowd
!width=70| Boxscore

Round 18

|- bgcolor="#CCCCFF" font size=1
!width=90| Date
!width=180| Home
!width=60| Score
!width=180| Away
!width=260| Venue
!width=70| Crowd
!width=70| Boxscore

Round 19

|- bgcolor="#CCCCFF" font size=1
!width=90| Date
!width=180| Home
!width=60| Score
!width=180| Away
!width=260| Venue
!width=70| Crowd
!width=70| Boxscore

Round 20

|- bgcolor="#CCCCFF" font size=1
!width=90| Date
!width=180| Home
!width=60| Score
!width=180| Away
!width=260| Venue
!width=70| Crowd
!width=70| Boxscore

Ladder

The NBL tie-breaker system as outlined in the NBL Rules and Regulations states that in the case of an identical win–loss record, the results in games played between the teams will determine order of seeding.

13-way Head-to-Head between Wollongong Hawks (5-3), Townsville Crocodiles (4-4) and Gold Coast Blaze (3-5). 

1Cairns Taipans won Head-to-Head (3-1).

Finals 

The 2009–10 National Basketball League Finals played between 18 February 2010 and 12 March 2010, consisting of two best-of-three semi-finals and final series in which the higher seed hosts the first and deciding third game.

Playoff Seedings
 Perth Wildcats
 Wollongong Hawks
 Townsville Crocodiles
 Gold Coast Blaze

The NBL tie-breaker system as outlined in the NBL Rules and Regulations states that in the case of a tie of three or more teams, winning percentage in games played only between those teams will determine order of finish.

Under that system, Wollongong (5–3) will finish second, Townsville (4–4) third and Gold Coast (3–5) fourth.

Playoff bracket

Semi-finals

|- bgcolor="#CCCCFF" font size=1
!width=90| Date
!width=180| Home
!width=60| Score
!width=180| Away
!width=260| Venue
!width=70| Crowd
!width=70| Boxscore

Grand Final

|- bgcolor="#CCCCFF" font size=1
!width=90| Date
!width=180| Home
!width=60| Score
!width=180| Away
!width=260| Venue
!width=70| Crowd
!width=70| Boxscore

Season awards
Most Valuable Player: Corey Williams, Townsville Crocodiles
Rookie of the Year: Jesse Wagstaff, Perth Wildcats
Best Defensive Player: Dillon Boucher, New Zealand Breakers
Best Sixth Man: Erron Maxey, Gold Coast Blaze
Most Improved Player: Anthony Petrie, Gold Coast Blaze
Coach of the Year: Gordie McLeod, Wollongong Hawks
Finals MVP: Kevin Lisch, Perth Wildcats
All-NBL First Team:
Corey Williams – Townsville Crocodiles
Kirk Penney – New Zealand Breakers
Tywain McKee – Wollongong Hawks
Mark Worthington – Melbourne Tigers
Shawn Redhage – Perth Wildcats
All-NBL Second Team:
Adam Ballinger – Adelaide 36ers
C. J. Bruton – New Zealand Breakers
Anthony Petrie – Gold Coast Blaze
Adam Gibson – Gold Coast Blaze
Ayinde Ubaka – Gold Coast Blaze
All-NBL Third Team:
Julius Hodge – Melbourne Tigers
Glen Saville – Wollongong Hawks
John Gilchrist – Adelaide 36ers
Cameron Tragardh – Wollongong Hawks
Larry Davidson – Wollongong Hawks

See also
2009–10 NBL squads

References

 
Australia,NBL
2009–10 in Australian basketball
2009 in New Zealand basketball
2010 in New Zealand basketball